Vladislav Oleksandrovych Sierov (14 June 1978 — September 2012), was a Ukrainian professional ice hockey player. He played for multiple teams during his career, which lasted from 1999 until 2007. He played internationally for the Ukrainian national team at the 2004 World Championship and the 2002 Winter Olympics.

Career statistics

Regular season and playoffs

International

External links
 

1978 births
2012 deaths
Bakersfield Condors (1998–2015) players
Chicago Wolves players
Detroit Vipers players
Flint Generals players
Fort McMurray Oil Barons players
Greensboro Generals players
Hershey Bears players
HK ATEK Kyiv players
HC Berkut players
Ice hockey players at the 2002 Winter Olympics
Manitoba Moose (IHL) players
Motor City Mechanics players
Olympic ice hockey players of Ukraine
Quad City Mallards (UHL) players
Sokil Kyiv players
Sportspeople from Kyiv
Syracuse Crunch players
Ukrainian ice hockey right wingers